Notostylops ("south pillar face") is a genus of extinct South American ungulates from Eocene Argentina. Fossils of the genus have been found in the Sarmiento, Casamayor, Andesitas Huancache and Koluel Kaike Formations.

Description 

Notostylops was a very generalized animal, very similar to first eutherians and ungulates. It would have superficially resembled a marmot or a wombat and is suspected to have browsed on low-growing plants. It was probably adapted to a fairly wide range of ecological niches, but its robustness indicates it had same digging traits. Its tall skull housed rodent-like incisor teeth.

References 

Notoungulates
Prehistoric placental genera
Eocene mammals of South America
Divisaderan
Mustersan
Casamayoran
Paleogene Argentina
Fossils of Argentina
Fossil taxa described in 1897
Taxa named by Florentino Ameghino
Golfo San Jorge Basin
Sarmiento Formation